The 2020–21 Olympique Lyonnais Féminin season was the club's seventeenth season since FC Lyon joined OL as its women's section. Olympique Lyonnais finished runner up in the Division 1 Féminine for the first time in 14 seasons, won the Coupe de France Féminine and where eliminated from the UEFA Women's Champions League by Paris Saint-Germain.

Season events
On 22 June, Olympique Lyonnais announced that they had extended their contract with Sarah Bouhaddi until 30 June 2024, and with Dzsenifer Marozsán until 30 June 2023.

On 1 July, Olympique Lyonnais announced that they had signed professional contracts with academy player Inès Benyahia, Alice Sombath and Vicki Bècho from Paris Saint-Germain and Assimina Maoulida from US Orléans.

On 21 September, Shanice van de Sanden left Olympique Lyonnais to join VfL Wolfsburg.

On 23 September, Celia joined Olympique Lyonnais on loan from OL Reign for the season.

On 18 December, Ada Hegerberg extended her contract with Olympique Lyonnais until 30 June 2024.

On 5 January, Olympique Lyonnais extended their contract with Jodie Taylor until the end of the season. The following day, 6 January, Olympique Lyonnais extended their contract with Manon Revelli until 30 June 2023, and also loan her to Servette until the end of the season.

On 12 January, Olympique Lyonnais announced the signing of Catarina Macario from Stanford Cardinal on a contract until 30 June 2023.

On 20 January, Olympique Lyonnais announced the signing of Damaris Egurrola from Everton on a contract until 30 June 2024.

On 4 February, Griedge Mbock extended her contract with Olympique Lyonnais until 30 June 2024.

On 10 February, Amandine Henry extended her contract with Olympique Lyonnais until 30 June 2023, with the option of an additional year.

On 17 March, Eugénie Le Sommer extended her contract with Olympique Lyonnais until 30 June 2023.

On 22 April, Janice Cayman extended her contract with Olympique Lyonnais until 30 June 2023.

On 7 May, Delphine Cascarino extended her contract with Olympique Lyonnais until 30 June 2024.

On 5 June, Sarah Bouhaddi and Dzsenifer Marozsán joined OL Reign on loan until 31 December 2021.

Squad

Transfers

In

Loans in

Out

Loans out

Released

Friendlies

Competitions

Overview

Division 1

Results summary

Results by matchday

Results

Table

Coupe de France

UEFA Champions League

Squad statistics

Appearances 

|-
|colspan="16"|Players away from the club on loan:
|-
|colspan="16"|Players who appeared for Olympique Lyonnais but left during the season:

|}

Goal scorers

Clean sheets

Disciplinary record

References 

Olympique Lyonnais
Olympique Lyonnais Féminin